Hon. Ellen Joyce CBE born Ellen Rice (12 January 1832 – 21 May 1924) was a British organiser of women's emigration from the UK. She started and ran the British Women's Emigration Association.

Life
She was the eldest child of Francis Rice, 5th Baron Dynevor and Harriett Ives Barker. Her younger brother was Arthur Rice, 6th Baron Dynevor. Her father was an Anglican clergyman and the vicar of Fairford.

Ellen Rice married the Reverend James Gerald Joyce (1819-78) on 20 September 1855. He was rector of Stratfield Saye from 1855 until his death, but his interests were in archaeology and he led excavations at Calleva Atrebatum where he discovered the Silchester eagle in 1866. He and Ellen had one son Arthur Gerald Joyce in 1856.

In 1883 the Girls' Friendly Society appointed Joyce as their "emigration correspondent". Joyce had been one of the GFS's seventy-five founding associates and she wanted to support emigration, but she was aware of the risks that girls would be exposed to. Parties of women travelling with the GFS were given "anchor crosses" to place on their luggage.

In 1884 she founded the United Englishwomen's Emigration Association. Later that year Joyce and her son Arthur accompanied 80 GFS emigrants across the Atlantic. She travelled across Canada using the Canadian Pacific Railroad that was then incomplete but getting to the western shore. When she returned she reported her success to the GFS, but her new organisation was taking off. The following year it had its own finances and by 1888 it had to change its name to the "United British Women's Emigration Association" as Scottish emigrants of the "Scotch Girl's Friendly Association" and the "Scottish YWCA" also wanted to travel under her organisation's banner.

Joyce was able to decide who was the right type of emigrants as she saw that the emigration could create a better British Empire. She would speak at Church congresses noting the Christianising and moral improvement made possible by the new women emigrants sent by her organisation. This mission lead to organisation to send less women as they tried to identify the very best emigrants who could assist in improving the country they were emigrating to. At first the emigrants were bound for Canada, New Zealand and Australia but as the century ended there was growing interest in South Africa. Joyce interviewed Baden-Powell for BWEA journal, The Imperial Colonist about the need for women in South Africa in 1902 and with her regret the committee that the organisation formed to oversee the interest became independent as the "South African Colonisation Society" in 1903. Louisa Knightley was president of the South African Colonisation Society and she was the editor of the Imperial Colonist journal from 1901 to 1913.

Joyce lead the United British Women's Emigration Association, but her role in the GFS continued.

In the 1920 New Year Honours, Joyce became a CBE in recognition of her work as Vice-President of the British Women's Emigration Association. A fellow awardee was Grace Lefroy who was the honorary secretary of the same association.

She died in Winchester in 1924.

References

1832 births
1924 deaths
British activists
People from Cotswold District
People from Stratfield Saye
Daughters of barons